Mesosa hirticornis is a species of beetle in the family Cerambycidae. It was described by Gressitt in 1936, originally under the genus Saimia. It is known from Taiwan.

References

hirticornis
Beetles described in 1936